This is a summary of 1908 in music in the United Kingdom.

Events
26 March – The first public performance of York Bowen's Viola Concerto is given by Lionel Tertis at the Wigmore Hall.
31 July – Frederick Septimus Kelly wins a gold medal for Great Britain as a member of the winning crew in the eights at the 1908 Summer Olympics in London.
3 December – Edward Elgar's Symphony No. 1 receives its première at the Free Trade Hall in Manchester, performed by the Hallé Orchestra and conducted by Hans Richter.
7 December – Four days after its première, Elgar's Symphony No. 1 is performed at the Queen's Hall by the London Symphony Orchestra, again conducted by Hans Richter.
date unknown – Alexander Mackenzie becomes President of the International Musical Society.

Popular music
"Has Anybody Here Seen Kelly?" ("Kelly from the Isle of Man") by Clarence Wainwright Murphy & Will Letters
"I Hear You Calling Me" by Harold Lake & Charles Marshall
"The Outlaw" by William Wallace

Classical music: new works
York Bowen – Viola Concerto in C minor
Henry Walford Davies – Solemn Melody for organ
Harry Evans – Dafydd ap Gwilym (cantata) 
Hamilton Harty – Violin Concerto
Joseph Hinton – L'allegro
Alice Verne-Bredt – Phantasie Piano Trio and Phantasie Piano Quartet

Opera
A Welsh Sunset by Philip Michael Faraday

Musical theatre
25 April – Havana, with book by George Grossmith, Jr. and Graham Hill, music by Leslie Stuart, lyrics by Adrian Ross and additional lyrics by George Arthurs, opens at the Gaiety Theatre, London, starring Evie Greene, W. H. Berry, Lawrence Grossmith and Mabel Philipson.
3 September – King of Cadonia, with book by Frederick Lonsdale, lyrics by Adrian Ross and Arthur Wimperis and music by Sidney Jones and Frederick Rosse, opens at the Prince of Wales Theatre in London, where it runs for 333 performances.

Births
12 January – Joan Mary Last, music educator, author and composer (died 2002)
28 January – Jimmy Shand, accordionist and bandleader (died 2000)
29 February – A. L. Lloyd, folk song collector (died 1982)
18 March – Ivor Moreton, singer, composer and pianist (died 1984)
25 March – Bridget D'Oyly Carte, head of D'Oyly Carte Opera Company (died 1985)
10 July – Donald Peers, singer (died 1973)
18 July – Barry Gray, television composer (died 1984)
19 October
Spike Hughes, jazz musician, composer and music journalist (died 1987) 
Sydney MacEwan, singer and priest (died 1991) 
21 October – Howard Ferguson, composer and musicologist (died 1999)
17 December – William Brocklesby Wordsworth, English/Scottish composer and pianist (died 1988)
date unknown – Jeannie Robertson, folk singer (died 1975)

Deaths
2 March – Walter Slaughter, conductor and composer, 48
12 March – Clara Novello, soprano, 89

See also
 1908 in the United Kingdom

References

British Music, 1908 in
Music
British music by year
1900s in British music